Shirburn Hill is a  biological Site of Special Scientific Interest just outside and to the northeast of Watlington, Oxfordshire.

The hill has chalk grassland, chalk heath, scrub and broadleaved woodland. Most grasslands in the Chilterns are maintained by stock, and the site is unusual in being cropped only by rabbits. Less closely grazed areas have taller grass with species such as false oat-grass, tor-grass and red fescue. There are large areas of  hawthorn and buckthorn scrub.

References

Sites of Special Scientific Interest in Oxfordshire